Hugh Morris may refer to:
Bill DeMott (born 1966), professional wrestler previously known as Hugh Morrus
Hugh Morris (cricketer) (born 1963), Welsh former cricketer
Hugh Morris (Scottish footballer) (1900–1965), Scottish footballer 
Hugh Morris (Welsh footballer) (1872–1897), Welsh footballer
Hugh Morris (Australian footballer) (1932–2013), Australian rules footballer
Hugh M. Morris (1878–1966), American judge
Hugh Morris (businessman) (1929–2010), New Zealand businessman who founded McDonald's New Zealand in 1976